Klaus Just (born 29 March 1964 in Nürtingen, Baden-Württemberg) is a retired West German sprinter.

His personal best time was 45.52 seconds, achieved in August 1985 in Stuttgart.

Just represented the sports club SV Salamander Kornwestheim.

Achievements

1Did not finish in the semifinals

References

1964 births
Living people
People from Nürtingen
Sportspeople from Stuttgart (region)
West German male sprinters
European Athletics Championships medalists
SV Salamander Kornwestheim athletes
20th-century German people